RNLB Keith Anderson was an  lifeboat which served at Newhaven Lifeboat Station for six years, in the relief fleet for one year and finished her RNLI career in Hartlepool in 2003 after serving for three years.

History 
This important East Sussex station needed an improved class of lifeboat to enhance the stations capabilities. The Arun-class was considered to be suitable for this stations mooring facilities on the River Ouse which runs through the Port of Newhaven. She was laid down by VT Halmatic, and was sent to William Osborne in Littlehampton to be fitted out. During spring 1985 she underwent her self-righting trials following which all her electronic equipment was installed and commissioned. She was then sent to the RNLI depot at Poole.

The lifeboat, which cost £394,928, was funded by a gift from Esma Anderson of Grosvenor Square in London in memory of her husband Keith Anderson, after whom the boat was named. The Keith Anderson arrived in Newhaven on 9 August 1985. The official naming service took place in Newhaven on 27 May 1986 when Anderson officially handed over and named the lifeboat. By the time of this ceremony the lifeboat had already been launched to service on 33 occasions and had been accredited with saving the lives of four people.

Relief fleet service 

In October 1999 the Keith Anderson was taken away from Newhaven and was placed on service in the RNLI’s relief fleet. She was sent to the RNLI depot at Poole. This was a short livid arrangement as in October 2000 she was reassigned to be the Hartlepool lifeboat. She remained at that station for three years until 2003.

Disposal 
Between 2003 and 2006 the Keith Anderson was placed in storage at the Poole Depot until a deal was negotiated by the RNLI to send three Arun-class lifeboat to China to join the China Ministry of Transport Rescue and Salvage organisation. She, along with her sisters were loaded aboard a container ship at Felixstowe and shipped to China. Once there the China Rescue & Salvage Bureau placed her on station at the city of Dalian, a seaport in the south of Liaoning province. She was renamed Huaying 395.

References 

Arun-class lifeboats
1985 ships